The WhatsOnStage Awards, founded in 2001 as the Theatregoers' Choice Awards, are a fan-driven set of awards organised by the theatre website WhatsOnStage.com, based on a popular vote recognising performers and productions of English theatre, with an emphasis on London's West End theatre.

The 2020 WhatsOnStage Awards, the 20th, took place on Sunday, 1 March 2020 at the Prince of Wales Theatre. It was hosted by theatre star Jodie Prenger and Tom Read Wilson and featured performances from all five nominees for Best New Musical, as well as the cast of The Color Purple.

For the first time in the history of the awards show, the ceremony was broadcast on BBC Radio 2 with hosts Elaine Paige and Ken Bruce providing backstage commentary and exclusive interviews with the winners, nominees and special guests. Additionally, a new category was introduced that was voted for by Radio 2 listeners which replaced the previous Best West End Show category. The Audience Award for Best Musical, was open to any musical has run for longer than one year in the West End.

Max Martin's jukebox musical & Juliet at the  received a record-breaking thirteen nominations at the ceremony and was the night's biggest winner, receiving six awards. For plays, the revival of Noël Coward's Present Laughter received the most nominations with eight, winning two. Musical Come from Away was also notable for winning all five of the awards it was nominated for.

Productions
The following productions received nominations at the 2020 WhatsOnStage Awards:

& Juliet - Shaftesbury Theatre
9 to 5 - Savoy Theatre
Appropriate - Donmar Warehouse
Betrayal - Harold Pinter Theatre
The Book of Mormon - Prince of Wales Theatre
The Color Purple - Curve
Come from Away - Phoenix Theatre
Dear Evan Hansen - Noël Coward Theatre
Death of a Salesman - Young Vic/Piccadilly Theatre
The Doctor - Almeida Theatre
Everybody's Talking About Jamie - Apollo Theatre
Evita - Regent's Park Open Air Theatre
Falsettos - The Other Palace
Fiver - Southwark Playhouse
Grief is the Thing with Feathers - Barbican Theatre
Hamilton - Victoria Palace Theatre
High Fidelity - Turbine Theatre
Joseph and the Amazing Technicolor Dreamcoat - London Palladium
Les Misérables - Sondheim Theatre
Life of Pi - Sheffield Theatres
The Light in the Piazza - Southbank Centre
The Lion King - Lyceum Theatre
Lungs - The Old Vic
Mamma Mia! - Novello Theatre
Mame - Hope Mill Theatre
Matilda the Musical - Cambridge Theatre
Mary Poppins - Prince Edward Theatre
A Midsummer Night's Dream - Bridge Theatre
My Beautiful Laundrette - Curve/Belgrade Theatre
The Night of the Iguana - Noël Coward Theatre
Peter Pan - Park Theatre
The Phantom of the Opera - Her Majesty's Theatre
Only Fools and Horses The Musical - Theatre Royal Haymarket
Preludes - Southwark Playhouse
Present Laughter - The Old Vic
Romeo & Juliet - UK Tour
Rosmersholm - Duke of York's Theatre
School of Rock - Gillian Lynne Theatre
Six - Lyric TheatreSmall Island - National Theatre LiveThriller – Live - Lyric TheatreTina - Aldwych TheatreA Very Expensive Poison - The Old VicThe View UpStairs - Soho TheatreThe Son - Kiln Theatre/Duke of York's TheatreWaitress - Adelphi TheatreWest Side Story - Royal ExchangeWicked - Apollo Victoria Theatre

Winners and nominees
The nominees for the 20th WhatsOnStage Awards were announced on 5 December 2019.

Productions with multiple wins and nominations
 Multiple wins 
6 wins: & Juliet5 wins: Come from Away2 wins: Dear Evan Hansen, Falsettos, Present Laughter Multiple nominations 
13 nominations: & Juliet8 nominations: Evita, Present Laughter7 nominations: Mame, Waitress5 nominations: Come from Away, Joseph and the Amazing Technicolor Dreamcoat4 nominations: Betrayal, Death of a Salesman, Lungs, The Doctor3 nominations: Dear Evan Hansen, Mary Poppins, My Beautiful Laundrette, Rosmersholm, The Light in the Piazza2 nominations: Appropriate, A Midsummer Night's Dream, Equus, Falsettos, Life of Pi, Only Fools and Horses The Musical, Small Island, The Son''

References

British theatre awards